Bonanza Gift Shop is a landmark located on the Las Vegas Strip between the Sahara Las Vegas and the Stratosphere Las Vegas.

According to British Airways, the shop "won't let you down when looking for the perfect souvenir."  However Fodor's says "Ok, so it may not, in fact, be the world's largest, but it's the city's largest—and for that matter, the city's best—souvenir store."

History 
Bonanza Gifts was established in 1980. Before Bonanza, the corner mall contained several smaller shops and two casinos: Jackpot Casino and Money Tree Casino.

It was the Las Vegas Review-Journal'''s online readers pick for Best Gift Shop in 2006.

In 2016, the property was sold for $50 million to Haim Gabay, who had been operating the store as a tenant for a year.

 Film history 
The shop was featured on the PBS show Going Places.
This store features in the 2016 Nicolas Cage movie The Trust''.

References

External links 
 

Las Vegas Strip
Landmarks in Nevada
Buildings and structures in Las Vegas